Aubrey and Gus is a Canadian children's television series which aired on CBC Television between September 26, 1955, and June 18, 1956.

Aubrey is a puppet raccoon who has a boy's voice so his family cannot understand him. He becomes friends with a boy named Gus and together they search for Aubrey's raccoon voice.

External links 
 

1955 Canadian television series debuts
1956 Canadian television series endings
CBC Television original programming
1950s Canadian children's television series
Canadian television shows featuring puppetry
Black-and-white Canadian television shows